Eliza Township is located in Mercer County, Illinois in the United States. As of the 2010 census, its population was 419 and it contained 188 housing units.

Geography

Demographics

References

External links
City-data.com
Illinois State Archives

Townships in Mercer County, Illinois
Populated places established in 1853
Townships in Illinois